Nesopupa is a genus of very small air-breathing land snails, terrestrial pulmonate gastropod mollusks in the subfamily Nesopupinae  of the family Vertiginidae.

Nesopupa is the type genus of the subfamily Nesopupinae within the Vertiginidae.

Distribution 
The distribution of the genus Nesopupa includes Hawaii, Federated States of Micronesia, Palau, Guam, the Cook Islands, Mauritius, Réunion and Saint Helena.

Species
Species within the genus Nesopupa include:

 Nesopupa alloia Cooke & Pilsbry, 1920
 Nesopupa anceyana Cooke & Pilsbry, 1920
 Nesopupa armata (Pease, 1871)
 Nesopupa bacca Pease, 1871 (taxon inquirendum)
 Nesopupa baldwini Ancey, 1904
 Nesopupa bishopi Cooke & Pilsbry, 1920
Nesopupa cocosensis (Dall, 1900) 
 Nesopupa comorensis Pilsbry, 1920
 Nesopupa dentifera (Pease, 1871)
 Nesopupa dispersa Cooke & Pilsbry, 1920
 Nesopupa dubitabilis Cooke & Pilsbry, 1920
 Nesopupa eapensis  (Boettger, 1881) 
 Nesopupa forbesi Cooke & Pilsbry, 1920
 Nesopupa galapagensis Vagvolgyi, 1974
 Nesopupa godeffroyi (Boettger, 1881)
 Nesopupa gonioplax Pilsbry, 1920
 Nesopupa hackerae Stanisic, 2010
 Nesopupa incerta (G. Nevill, 1870)
 Nesopupa infrequens Cooke & Pilsbry, 1920
 Nesopupa kauaiensis Cooke & Pilsbry, 1920
 Nesopupa limatula Cooke & Pilsbry, 1920
 Nesopupa litoralis Cooke & Pilsbry, 1920 
 Nesopupa maaseni Altena, 1975
 Nesopupa madgei Peile, 1936 
 Nesopupa mariei (Crosse, 1871)
 Nesopupa micra Pilsbry, 1920
 Nesopupa moellendorffi (O. Boettger, 1890)
 Nesopupa mokaensis Kennard, 1943
 Nesopupa moluccana (O. Boettger, 1891)
 Nesopupa moreleti (A. D. Brown, 1870)
 Nesopupa morini Madge, 1938
 Nesopupa nannodes (Quadras & Möllendorff, 1898)
 Nesopupa newcombi Cooke & Pilsbry, 1920
 Nesopupa novopommerana I. Rensch, 1932
 Nesopupa oahuensis Cooke & Pilsbry, 1920
 Nesopupa paivae (J.C.H. Crosse, 1865) 
 Nesopupa pleurophora (Shuttleworth, 1852)
 Nesopupa plicifera Ancey, 1904 (taxon inquirendum) 
 Nesopupa ponapica (Möllendorff, 1900)
 Nesopupa proscripta (E. A. Smith, 1905)
 Nesopupa quadrasi  (Möllendorff, 1894) 
 Nesopupa rarotonga Brook, 2010
 Nesopupa scotti (Brazier, 1875)
 Nesopupa singularis Cooke & Pilsbry, 1920
 Nesopupa subcentralis Cooke & Pilsbry, 1920
 Nesopupa tantilla (A. Gould, 1847)
 Nesopupa tenimberica Haas, 1937
 Nesopupa thaanumi Ancey, 1904 
 Nesopupa turtoni Smith, 1892
 Nesopupa vinsoni Madge, 1946
 Nesopupa waianensis Cooke & Pilsbry, 1920 
 Nesopupa wesleyana Ancey, 1904
 Nesopupa yamagutii Kuroda, 1941

Synonyms
 Nesopupa bandulana Connolly, 1922: synonym of Vertigo bandulana (Connolly, 1922) (original combination)
 Nesopupa bisulcata (Jickeli, 1873): synonym of Afripupa bisulcata (Jickeli, 1873): synonym of Vertigo bisulcata (Jickeli, 1873) (superseded combination)
 Nesopupa corrugata (Preston, 1912): synonym of Insulipupa corrugata (Preston, 1912)
 Nesopupa decaryi Fischer-Piette & Bedoucha, 1965: synonym of Nesopupa minutalis (Morelet, 1881): synonym of Insulipupa minutalis (Morelet, 1881) (junior synonym)
 Nesopupa dedecora Pilsbry, 1902: synonym of Vertigo (Vertilla) dedecora (Pilsbry, 1902) represented as Vertigo dedecora (Pilsbry, 1902) (original combination)
 Nesopupa densistriata Adam, 1954: synonym of Afripupa densestriata (Adam, 1954) (original combination)
 Nesopupa farquhari Pilsbry, 1917: synonym of Vertigo farquhari Pilsbry, 1917 (original name)
 Nesopupa ganzae W. Adam, 1954: synonym of Insulipupa ganzae W. Adam, 1954 (original combination)
 Nesopupa griqualandica (Melvill & Ponsonby, 1893): synonym of Vertigo griqualandica (Melvill & Ponsonby, 1893) (superseded combination)
 Nesopupa insularis (Dartevelle, 1952): synonym of Insulipupa insularis (Dartevelle, 1952)
 Nesopupa kanongae Adam, 1954: synonym of Afripupa kanongae (Adam, 1954)
 Nesopupa malayana (Issel, 1874): synonym of Insulipupa malayana (Issel, 1874)
 Nesopupa minor (O. Boettger, 1870) †: synonym of Vertigo minor O. Boettger, 1870 † (new combination not accepted)
 Nesopupa minutalis (Morelet, 1881): synonym of Insulipupa minutalis (Morelet, 1881)
 Nesopupa peilei Madge, 1938: synonym of Insulipupa peilei (Madge, 1938) (original combination)
 Nesopupa petiti Fischer-Piette & Vukadinovic, 1971: synonym of Nesopupa minutalis (Morelet, 1881): synonym of Insulipupa minutalis (Morelet, 1881) (junior synonym)
 Nesopupa rodriguezensis Connolly, 1925: synonym of Afripupa rodriguezensis (Connolly, 1925)
 Nesopupa tamagonari Pilsbry & Y. Hirase, 1904: synonym of Vertigo (Vertilla) dedecora (Pilsbry, 1902) represented as Vertigo dedecora (Pilsbry, 1902) (junior synonym)
 Nesopupa vengoensis Connolly, 1925: synonym of Afripupa vengoensis (Connolly, 1925) (original combination)
 Nesopupa ventricosa (H. Adams, 1867): synonym of Nesopupa mokaensis Kennard, 1943 (junior homonym, non Draparnaud, 1801)
 Nesopupa waterloti Fischer-Piette & Bedoucha, 1965: synonym of Nesopupa minutalis (Morelet, 1881): synonym of Insulipupa minutalis (Morelet, 1881) (junior synonym)

References

External links
 Pilsbry, H. A. (1900). Notes on Polynesian and East Indian Pupidae. Proceedings of the Academy of Natural Sciences of Philadelphia. 52: 431-433
 Iredale, T. (1939). A review of the land Mollusca of Western Australia. Records of the Western Australian Museum. 2(1): 1-88, pls 1-5 
 Boettger, O. (1881). Die Pupa-Arten Oceaniens. Conchologische Mittheilungen. 1 (4): 45-72, pl. 10-12. Cassel (Th. Fischer)
 Adams, H. (1867). Descriptions of new species of shells collected by Geoffrey Nevill, Esq., at Mauritius. Proceedings of the Zoological Society of London. 1867: 303-307, pl. 19
 Iredale T. (1937). A basic list of the land Mollusca of Australia. The Australian Zoologist. 8(4): 287-333

Vertiginidae
Taxonomy articles created by Polbot